is a 2010 Japanese animated film, and a remake of the television series The Adventures of Hutch the Honeybee. The film debuted at number six at the Japanese box office. The film was Group TAC's final production before it closed in August 2010.

Plot
Hutch is a male bee who, along with his friends, begins to find his mother, a queen bee, after bees have been attacked by a group of wasps. Hutch makes friends with several other insects and with Ami, a human girl who can talk to them.

Cast
 Ayaka Saitō as Hutch
 Ayaka Wilson as Ami
 Naoki Tanaka as Kunekune
 Jun Komori as Poncho
 Eiji Bandō as Koganenash

References

External links
  
 

2010 films
2010 anime films
Adventure anime and manga
Animated films based on animated series
2010s Japanese-language films
Films with screenplays by Kundō Koyama
Shochiku films